Alarm Clock Andy is a 1920 American silent comedy film directed by Jerome Storm and written by Agnes Christine Johnston. The film stars Charles Ray, Millicent Fisher, George Webb, Tom Guise, and Andrew Robson. The film was released on March 14, 1920, by Paramount Pictures. It is not known whether the film currently survives.

Plot
As described in a film magazine, Andrew Gray (Ray) is a shy young man who stutters but knows more about the automobile business of his employer Mr Wells (Guise) than anyone else in the office, but his bashfulness keeps him back. William Blinker (Webb), a cocky young bluffer, advances to assistant manager just four months after starting work. Andrew hopelessly worships his employer's daughter Dorothy (Fisher). The immediate success of the firm depends upon it landing a contract for large motor trucks from Josiah Dodge (Robson). William tries, but his freshness antagonizes Josiah and he fails. In the meantime Andrew meets Dorothy and when she thinks his name is Blinker, he is too bashful to deny it. He accidentally also meets Josiah. His personality appeals to both, and after a series of amusing complications brought about by his having assumed the name Blinker, he lands the Dodge contract and wins the young woman.

Cast
Charles Ray as Andrew Gray
Millicent Fisher as Dorothy Wells
George Webb as William Blinker
Tom Guise as Mr. Wells
Andrew Robson as Josiah Dodge

References

External links 

1920 films
1920s English-language films
Silent American comedy films
1920 comedy films
Paramount Pictures films
Films directed by Jerome Storm
American black-and-white films
American silent feature films
1920s American films